Garry Michael White is an American playwright and screenwriter.  He wrote the screenplay for Scarecrow, which shared the Grand Prix with The Hireling at the 1973 Cannes Film Festival. White also co-wrote the 1976 action film Sky Riders and the romantic drama The Promise in 1979.  Has a new full-length play "Wish Mirage" which was filmed in a staged reading presentation in New York in December 2020.

References

External links
 

American dramatists and playwrights
Living people
Year of birth missing (living people)